Jallaram is a census town in Karimnagar district of the Indian state of Telangana.

Demographics 
 India census, Jallaram Kamanpur had a population of 11,100. Males constitute 52% of the population and females 48%. Jallaram Kamanpur has an average literacy rate of 60%, higher than the national average of 59.5%: male literacy is 66%, and female literacy is 52%. In Jallaram Kamanpur, 11% of the population is under 6 years of age.

References 

Cities and towns in Karimnagar district
Census towns in Karimnagar district